Chugworth Academy was an adult webcomic by Dave Cheung (art and writing) and Jamal Joseph Jr. (writing) on June 19, 2000. It was relaunched as Chugworth Academy 2 on May 21, 2003, having previously been a series of pin-ups and erotic animations Dave created under pen-name "Scribblekid".

After some server website issues which forced the site to shut down in mid-2007, Chugworth Academy returned, but updates were sporadic at best.  Cheung posted in January 2009 that his writer, Jamal (Jay) Joseph, had been too busy to work on scripts for Chugworth.

Plot
The strip revolves around the lives of four teenagers, two of whom attend Chugworth Academy, an elite prep school. The tone of the strip runs heavily towards sexual situations and fanservice. There are also several spinoff strips, like Pancake Motherfuckers and Classic Comedy Moments.

Cast

Major characters
Sally Richards - Cynical, sarcastic and has more intellectual clout than everyone she socializes with. She also has a geeky side to her nature that she tries very hard to conceal - mostly revolving around an unhealthy obsession with computer games and pencil and paper role-playing games. She also likes Kiyoshi very much and has sex with him (off-screen) often. The relationship has hit a rough spot when Kiyoshi accidentally broke both of Sally's legs by knocking her down a flight of stairs, ruining her chance at competing in the U.S. Open. Sally has therefore dumped Kiyoshi, although whether this is permanent or not remains to be seen. Her legs have healed since then, but she is still unable to walk and has to use a wheelchair, or has to be carried by Chloe.  She has also cut her previously long hair to chin length.
Chloe Winsdale - Sally's cousin and best friend, although they are often mistaken for sisters. Chloe hates anything mainstream and listens to the most obscure punk rock and heavy metal bands on the planet. She also likes to think that she is rebellious, even though she is a well-mannered, straight-A student. Her prized possession is her talking electronic keychain of Witchy Cranky Poo, from unreleased comic "The God Machine" by Chandra Free. Her other closest companion is a teddy bear with a pierced ear. It also seems she might be the only virgin among the main cast members.
Kiyoshi Masamune - A well-endowed half Japanese-half American.  Sally and Kiyoshi have been dating for what seems like forever, giving substance to the claim that "opposites attract." Dim-witted but good-natured and totally in love with Sally, Kiyoshi is a modestly successful underwear model and the public face of Splammo Drinks company. He is obsessed with sandwiches. Kiyoshi is now going through an emo phase as a result of being dumped by Sally, and is so depressing that even the other emos have told him to cheer up. His continuous consumption of Splammo has also had an ill effect on his mind, which causes him to see a foul-mouthed Mickey Mouse at odd times, and is also a likely contributor to his diminished intelligence quotient.
Ellice Matthews - Unstable, moody, as dim-witted as Kiyoshi, and perhaps bisexual, Ellice longs for a career as a top film actress but generally comes up short in the jobs she finally lands. She is Kiyoshi's best friend as well as a long-time friend of Sally and Chloe. Unfortunately, she is often the butt of their jokes. She is also Kiyoshi's father's lover, which was latterly a subject of some contention between them.

Supporting Characters
Dar - A character from Jamal Joseph's Goth and Jock strip who made an appearance early in Chugworth's continuity, Dar is the goth of the pair.  He has longish black hair and always wears a cross around his neck, and is obsessed with death and morbid subjects. The face on his shirts also changes with his mood, and says the mood that he is in.
Jam - The other half of Jamal's Goth and Jock duo, who appeared in the early storyline featuring the pair.  Jam is the jock of the two, and is often more boastful than he can realistically back up.  
Mr. Tummy Giggles -  Tummy Giggles is a children's television show host who also seems to be somewhat of a sex offender, groping Ellice when she served as the assistant on his show, and displaying somewhat pedophiliac tendencies.  He was last seen co-anchoring the New Bumpshire Action News with Laura Crabbs.
Laura Crabbs - Laura is the co-anchor of the New Bumpshire Action News, and is highly composed and professional, providing a comedic foil to her rather less professional co-workers.
P-Quay McNasty - P-Quay is a "former hip hop sensation" who now provides sports coverage for New Bumpshire Action News.  He is Caucasian, but wears a large jeweled dollar sign on a necklace and speaks African-American Vernacular English.
Mister Sundance - Chugworth Academy's fundamentalist Christian Religious Studies teacher who insists Sally is a slut for being the only one in her class to admit that she is not a virgin. He seems to have a personal vendetta against her because of that, despite her perfect grades. He is also quite possibly gay, ironically.
Manuel Bistro, Red Commando - Manuel is a Communist revolutionary who led a team of other revolutionaries and took over Sally's classroom briefly in an attempt to overthrow...well, something.  
Slappy Shortbobski - A member of Manuel Bistro's team who is a "master of the deadly art of Spoon Combat".  The exact nature of Spoon Combat has yet to be revealed.
Fernando Cassanova -  Fernando is another member of Bistro's team.  He is reputedly irresistible to women and wears a coat made from the "pubic hair of his conquests."  He also appears to be irresistible to Mr. Sundance, who "offered himself up" to Cassanova in order to "save" Sally and Chloe from the Red Commandos.
The Director - Director of the Blockbuster movie "The Slow and the Moderately Angry" as well as countless other Box Office hits. Does not tolerate failure.
Kiyoshi's Dad - He is the father of Kiyoshi, but he is also a ninja and insists Kiyoshi uphold that honor. He has a heavy accent, but is a ladies man like his son (sleeping with Ellice on more than one occasion). He tends to get his 'L's and his 'R's mixed up. He also believes that Naruto Uzumaki is the greatest ninja ever thus making some fans believe that he watches ninja based anime.
Mr. Splammodopolis - Head of the Splammo Drinks Empire and the world's wealthiest man. He neglects his son Demitri, instead concentrating on his protege Kiyoshi. Splammodopolis is possibly even less intelligent than Kiyoshi, insisting on ham flavored sodas and actually burning his employees alive when firing them.
Mr Splammodopolis' Assistant - Mr Splammodopolis' personal assistant who is several times more intelligent than her employer. She is very good at what she does and even better at angering Ellice Matthews when they first meet.
Demitri Splammodopolis - Heir to the Splammo-Inc fortune, he is often ignored by his father, who has taken a greater liking towards Kiyoshi. This induces a deep rooted hatred in Demitri towards Kiyoshi whom he finally decided to kill after finding out he was dating Sally Richards, who he had become infatuated with. He is currently in jail for the murder of Vance Petrol.
Rabbit Girl (Real name: Bunnie Mittens) - Demitri's unofficial girlfriend whom he solely uses for sex. She is rather naive and talkative, much to Demitri's pleasure and dismay respectively. She insists the two are in love. Her younger brother Bobby is also one of Sally's role-playing friends, who constantly speaks street slang.
Rabbit Girl's Friend (Real name: Aimee Downings) - Rabbit Girl's best friend who is sadly as naive as she is.
Vance Petrol - An A-list Hollywood action star, he is Kiyoshi's costar in his latest film, "The Slow and Moderately Angry", and is a parody of Vin Diesel. He stayed at Sally's house during the initial filming of the movie before meeting an untimely end. Seemingly invincible, it took several attempts on his life and a heart attack to kill him.
Pringles the Almadirro/Armadillo - Sally's pet Armadillo, given to her by Kiyoshi. Referred to as an 'Almadirro' by Kiyoshi and his father, Pringles carelessly flirts through life, doing such things as peeing on Sally and having sex with cats. He inadvertently caused Sally to break her legs when he was thrown at her by Kiyoshi, effectively ending Kiyoshi and Sally's relationship.
Tyrone - An African-American boy that plays Dungeons and Dragons with Sally after school. He appears to be a parody of Will Smith's character on The Fresh Prince of Bel-Air, with a rich Uncle Bill, an English butler named Gregory, and a short cousin named Charleston.
The Intern (correction might be needed) recurring character that never had her name stated. First possible appearance is on #208 where she is an intern on Kiyoshi's movie set where she got shot by Demitri, who was trying to kill Kiyoshi. From then on her left arm was always shown in a sling. She later worked in Taco Bell while still healing. On #354 she got hit by a kunai in her right arm, during a ninja fight at the Taco Bell, possibly by Kiyoshi's dad to stop her complaining.

Published works
A book was released in 2004, "Chugworth Academy: All Aboard the Mentalist Train", which is no longer available at the Chugworth Academy store or direct from the self-publisher, Lulu. Seven Seas Entertainment released a second bound collection, "Chugworth Academy Volume 1" on July 3, 2006; this version  differing from the first in print size, number of comics, and the addition of exclusive material.

External links
Chugworth Academy
Seven Seas Entertainment's Chugworth Academy Page
NetworkJay (Personal site of Jamal)

2000s webcomics
American comedy webcomics
Webcomics in print
Seven Seas Entertainment titles